The Dutch 1970–71 Tweede Divisie season was contested by 17 teams. The Tweede Divisie league would be disbanded after this season, so eleven teams returned to amateur football (either forced or on a voluntary basis). De Volewijckers were the last champions and they were promoted to the Eerste Divisie along with five other teams.

New entrants
Relegated from the Eerste Divisie:
 De Volewijckers
 RCH
 Fortuna Vlaardingen

League standings

See also
 1970–71 Eredivisie
 1970–71 Eerste Divisie
 1970–71 KNVB Cup

References
Netherlands - List of final tables (RSSSF)

Tweede Divisie seasons
3
Neth